Smålands nation is one of the thirteen student nations (a kind of student society) at Uppsala university in Sweden. It has around 1500 members, many of them international students. Smålands nation is well known for its live music scene and for its generous scholarships.

The nation was founded in 1645, and originally contained what is now Kalmar nation. In 1663 however, the nation was split into two nations named Wexiö nation and Kalmar nation. Following a disagreement between the two nations in 1667, Wexiö nation once again took the name Smålands nation.

The current nation house was built in 1954 and is located on S:t Larsgatan 5, close to Uppsala Domkyrka and the Fyris river.

Inspektors 
 Smålands nation

See also 
Småland Nation, Lund

Nations at Uppsala University
Student organizations established in the 17th century
1645 establishments in Sweden